The following lists events that happened during 1909 in the Kingdom of Denmark.

Incumbents
 Monarch – Frederick VIII
 Prime minister – Niels Neergaard (until 16 August), Ludvig Holstein-Ledreborg (until 28 October), Carl Theodor Zahle

Events
20 April – Women are given the right to vote in municipal elections. General women's suffrage is not introduced in Denmark until 1915.

Sports
 9 June  Skovshoved IF is founded.

Cycling
 14–23 August  The 1909 UCI Track Cycling World Championships are held in Copenhagen.

Births
 3 January – Victor Borge, Danish-American comedian, conductor and pianist (d. 2000)
 20 August – Martin A. Hansen, writer (d. 1955)
 20 December – Vagn Holmboe, composer (d. 1996)

Deaths
 13 February  Hans Peter Jørgen Julius Thomsen, lawyer (born 1826)
 27 April – Hugo Egmont Hørring, politician, prime minister of Denmark (b. 1842)
 7 May – Joachim Andersen, flutist, conductor and composer (b. 1847)
 9 July – Johannes Forchhammer, philologist (b. 1827)
 19 July –  Leopold Rosenfeld, composer (b. 1849)
 25 September – Thomas Skat Rørdam, theologian and bishop (b. 1832)
 13 October  – Janus la Cour, painter (b. 1837)
 21 November – Peder Severin Krøyer, Norwegian-born painter (b. 1851)
 4 December – Princess Marie of Orléans, wife of Prince Valdemar (b. 1865 in London)
 29/30 December – Carl Emil Krarup, telegraph engineer, mainly known for the invention of the Krarup cable, a kind of loaded cable (b. 1872)

References

 
Denmark
Years of the 20th century in Denmark
1900s in Denmark
Denmark